Dzidriņas is a village in Stopiņi Parish, Ropaži Municipality in the Vidzeme region and the Riga Planning Region of Latvia.

References 

Towns and villages in Latvia
Ropaži Municipality
Kreis Riga
Vidzeme